Couratari asterotricha is a species of woody plant from the family of Lecythidaceae. Only found in Brazil, this plant is threatened by heavy habitat loss.

References

asterotricha
Flora of Brazil
Critically endangered plants
Taxonomy articles created by Polbot